Christian Thomsen (1860–1921) was a Danish sculptor. He was employed at the Royal Porcelain Manufactory Royal Copenhagen from 1898, and is considered one of the most influential royal Danish sculptors of the 20th century. He produced over 100 figurines, including figures from Hans Christian Andersen's fairy tales, animals, and 36 commemorative plaques; it was Thomsen who produced the Danish Christmas plates in 1908.

References

Danish sculptors
Danish male artists
1860 births
1921 deaths
Place of birth missing
20th-century sculptors
19th-century sculptors
Male sculptors